Viktoria Steinbiß (August 19, 1892 – February 11, 1971) was a German politician of the Christian Democratic Union (CDU) and former member of the German Bundestag.

Life 
Steinbiß became a member of the CDU in 1945. She was the first woman to be elected to the Bielefeld city council, where she took over the leadership of her party's parliamentary group. In addition, she represented her party in the Provincial Council of Westphalia in 1946 and was deputy zone advisor of the British Zone from 1947 to 1948. From 2 October 1946 to 19 April 1947, she was a member of the first and second Appointed State Parliament of North Rhine-Westphalia, later moving into federal politics and belonging to the German Bundestag since its first election in 1949 to 1961. She was always elected to parliament via the CDU state list of North Rhine-Westphalia. From 1953 to 1961, she was deputy chairperson of the Bundestag Committee on Health Care.

Literature

References

1892 births
1971 deaths
Members of the Bundestag for North Rhine-Westphalia
Members of the Bundestag 1957–1961
Members of the Bundestag 1953–1957
Members of the Bundestag 1949–1953
20th-century German women politicians
Female members of the Bundestag
Members of the Bundestag for the Christian Democratic Union of Germany
Members of the Landtag of North Rhine-Westphalia